The 2019 season for the  cycling team began in January at the Tour Down Under. As a UCI WorldTeam, they were automatically invited and obligated to send a squad to every event in the UCI World Tour.

Team roster

Riders who joined the team for the 2019 season

Riders who left the team during or after the 2018 season

Season victories

National, Continental and World champions

Footnotes

References

External links

 

2019 road cycling season by team
Lotto–Soudal
2019 in Belgian sport